Atlantic (1929) (also known as Titanic: Disaster in the Atlantic for its mutilated home video release) is a British drama film directed and produced by Ewald André Dupont and starring Franklin Dyall and Madeleine Carroll. Originally, two versions were made, the English and German-language version Atlantik were shot simultaneously. Subsequently, the production of a French version (Atlantis) began in spring 1930 using different footage and partially an altered storyline with a different director. The fourth version was released as a silent film. The story was taken from the West End play The Berg by Ernest Raymond. The film is available online. It was one of the most expensive films of 1929.

Plot
The main plotline revolves around a man who has a shipboard affair with a fellow passenger, which is eventually discovered by his wife. The ship also has aboard an elderly couple, the Rools, who are on their anniversary cruise. Midway across the Atlantic Ocean, the Atlantic strikes an iceberg and is damaged to the point where it is sinking into the Atlantic. A shortage of lifeboats causes the crew to only allow women and children in (though the captain allows a few men to take to the last remaining boats as the disaster reaches its zenith) and many couples are separated. Mrs. Rool refuses to leave her husband and after the boats are gone all the passengers gather on the deck and sing "Nearer, My God, to Thee" as the Atlantic sinks into the ocean. The final scenes depict a group of passengers saying the Lord's Prayer in a flooding lounge.

Cast

Production
An urban legend claimed for many years that the movie was filmed aboard the White Star Line ship RMS Majestic. However, this is probably untrue, as the White Star Line would never have permitted their current flagship to be used as a cinematic stand-in for the worst disaster in the company's history. The origin of this legend may be due to the fact that early on in the film, there is a short scene where three of the characters meet on a grand staircase. The 'set' is almost identical to the first class entrance & staircase of either 'Majestic' or her older sister, the 'Leviathan'. However, the fact that the 'set' is vast and would have been costly to build, yet appears only once in the film, does make it plausible that this scene was filmed on board one of the two ships.

It is known that some scenes were actually filmed on board a P&O ship, the Mooltan. Indeed, the film was originally  made as Titanic but after lawsuits it was renamed Atlantic. These lawsuits were initiated by the White Star Line, which owned the RMS Titanic, and which was still in operation at the time. (White Star had in fact also owned a liner called  which was lost in 1873 with a heavy loss of life, but at the distance of half a century it was no longer considered as immediately traumatising as the Titanic). As well, the name Atlantic is sort of ubiquitous as numerous vessels, large and small, English language and other, have held the name.  The final scene of the movie was filmed as a shot of the liner sinking, but it was removed at the last minute for fear of upsetting Titanic survivors. This footage is now considered lost. A reconstruction of the original ending using an outtake from final scene of the 1953 Titanic film has been made available online.

Sound
Atlantic was one of the first British films made with the soundtrack optically recorded on the film (sound-on-film), and was Germany's first sound movie feature. In England, it was released in both sound and silent prints. The French version was the fourth French feature with sound-on-film.

As the first sound film about the sinking of the Titanic, it is also the first to feature the song "Nearer, My God to Thee," which is played by the ship's band and sung by passengers and crew.

Reception 
The Observer praised the use of sound in the film, though complained that of dialogue "too close...to literary tradition" and "flabby acting." In a retrospective review, David Cairns claimed that the film "became something of a laughing-stock in Britain" due to the actors speaking "as slowly as possible...his [Dupont's] desire to inflect each syllable with suitable weight and portent robbed the film of any sense of urgency."

See also 
List of films about the RMS Titanic

References

External links

German-language version Atlantik at IMDb
French-language version Atlantis at IMDb

1929 drama films
British black-and-white films
British disaster films
British drama films
Films shot at British International Pictures Studios
British epic films
Films about RMS Titanic
Films à clef
British films based on plays
Films directed by E. A. Dupont
Films set in the 1910s
British multilingual films
Transitional sound drama films
Columbia Pictures films
1920s disaster films
Films set on boats
1920s multilingual films
1920s British films